The European Payments Council Quick Response Code guidelines define the content of a QR code that can be used to initiate SEPA credit transfer (SCT). It contains all the necessary information in clear text. These QR code guidelines are used on many invoices and payment requests in the countries that support it (Austria, Belgium, Finland, Germany, The Netherlands) enabling tens of millions to pay without requiring manual input leading to lower error rates.

The EPC guidelines are available from the EPC itself. Another version has also been published by the Federation of Finnish Finance Services (FFI).

Sample content 

So the QR string could be
BCD
001
1
SCT
BPOTBEB1
Red Cross of Belgium
BE72000000001616
EUR1
CHAR

Urgency fund
Sample EPC QR code

History 
In the course of 2012, Austrian payment facilitator STUZZA (now part of PSA Payment Services Austria) defined the content of a QR code that could be used to initiate money transfers within the Single Euro Payments Area.

In February 2013, the European Payments Council (EPC) published the document 'Quick Response Code: Guidelines to Enable Data Capture for the Initiation of a Credit Transfer'.

These guidelines were quickly adopted by the Austrian banks. These QR code can be recognized thanks to the words "Zahlen mit Code" on the right.

These guidelines were later on used in Finland (2015), Germany (2015), the Netherlands (2016) and Belgium (2016).

Generators 
Various generators are available online to generate the QR code following the EPC guidelines:
 PSA "Zahlen mit code" on the right border
 Digiteal with "www.scan2pay.info" on the right border
 TEC-IT Generic QR code generator also supporting the EPC guidelines
 Pure EPC QR-code generator with all versions, API and without trackers
 GiroCode WordPress plugin and (currently dysfunctional) EPC QR code WordPress plugin

See also 

 Short Payment Descriptor
 International Bank Account Number (IBAN)

References 

Portal:Business and economics

Mobile payments